Change Congress was a project aiming to end corruption in the United States Congress by reducing what it considered the distorted influence of money in that legislative body. Founded in 2008 by Lawrence Lessig and Joe Trippi, Change Congress aimed to organize citizens to push candidates to make commitments on the following issues: take no money from lobbyists or PACs, vote to end earmarks, support publicly financed campaigns, and support reform to increase congressional transparency.

Change Congress later became Fix Congress First, and was finally named Rootstrikers. In November 2011, Lessig announced that Rootstrikers would join forces with Dylan Ratigan's Get Money Out campaign, under the umbrella of the United Republic organization. Rootstrikers subsequently became a project of Demand Progress.

History
Change Congress was officially launched  on March 20, 2008 at the National Press Club in Washington, D.C. when Lessig held a press conference  sponsored by the Sunlight Foundation.

Lessig had considered a run for Congress in 2008 under the Draft Lessig movement, but decided against it.  An exploratory committee and a private pollster determined that there was "no possible way" for Lessig to defeat Jackie Speier, and that Lessig would lose in a "big way".  Lessig conveyed that while he did not fear losing, he did fear that losing would be harmful to effectively displaying the importance of the Change Congress movement.

Change Congress's main aim is what he sees as "institutional corruption" in Congress, as opposed to cases of personal financial corruption and bribery, whereby the influence of money has an uneven, distracting, and detrimental pull on the United States Congress.

Change Congress operates in three phases: get candidates to embrace the reform platform; build a wiki-based map of reform candidates; and financially support the reformers. The first phase is similar to Lessig's alternative copyright strategy campaign, Creative Commons. From January 2009 on, Change Congress was focusing its efforts on promoting citizen-funded elections, mainly through its Donor Strike campaign and support for the Fair Elections Now Act, and the three stage strategy had disappeared from its website.

Pledge
Citizens are able to get a badge that customizes which Change Congress causes they support. They are then given code so that they can place their pledge on their own website. Candidates are given the same choice.  Change Congress' website mentions plans to compile an ongoing list of citizens and candidates, and which cause(s) they support.

As of January 9, 2009 the citizen and candidate pledge pages and tags were inoperable and no longer existed on the Change Congress website.

Tracking candidates
Change Congress hopes to use volunteers to create a comprehensive list of members of Congress and where they stand on issues of lobbyists, earmarks, public financing, and increased transparency in government.

As of January 9, 2009 the candidate tracking feature no longer existed on the Change Congress website.

Political donations
Change Congress also hopes to change citizens' campaign contribution habits by giving people the option of only supporting candidates who pledge to honor some or all of Change Congress' pledge commitments.

As of January 9, 2009 the political donation feature has been removed from the Change Congress website due to the Donor Strike campaign.

Donor Strike

On January 8, 2009, Lessig appeared on The Colbert Report, and the following day Change Congress announced the Donor Strike.

The Donor Strike is an attempt to gain support amongst congressmen for citizen-funded congressional campaigns and in particular the Fair Elections Now Act. By signing up for the strike, supporters pledge "not to donate to any federal candidate unless they support legislation making congressional elections citizen-funded, not special-interest funded." The campaign hopes to strong-arm congressmen into supporting citizen-funded elections by withholding campaign donations.

As of May 28, 2009 Change Congress says it has motivated $1,563,920 in pledged campaign donation withholdings through the Donor Strike, although there is no real way to verify these numbers.

References

External links
 change-congress.org(archived version at the Wayback Machine, December 18, 2008)

American political websites
Organizations established in 2008
Political advocacy groups in the United States